Daniel Lownsdale (1803–1862) was one of the founders of Portland, Oregon, United States.

Coming from Kentucky sometime before 1845, Lownsdale established the first tannery near the current location of Providence Park just west of downtown. Tanner Creek, which flowed by the site in the mid-19th century, was named after the tannery.

Lownsdale served as a member of the Provisional Legislature of Oregon in 1846. Lownsdale purchased the land that would become downtown Portland on September 22, 1848.  He resurveyed Portland, keeping the small blocks (200 feet per side, 64 feet streets), and adding the contiguous park blocks.

He became involved in a land dispute involving the authority of the laws from the Provisional Government with Josiah Lamberson Parrish. Lownsdale would defend the matter in court in a case that would make its way through the Oregon Supreme Court and to the United States Supreme Court in Lownsdale v. Parrish, 62 U.S. 290 (1858).

Lownsdale is buried in the Lone Fir Cemetery in Portland. Lownsdale Square is named after him.

References

External links
 History of Portland, Oregon, with Illustrations and Biographical Sketches by Harvey Whitefield Scott at Google Books

1803 births
1862 deaths
Members of the Provisional Government of Oregon
Politicians from Portland, Oregon
Place of birth missing
Burials at Lone Fir Cemetery